The Shaurya Chakra is an Indian military decoration awarded for valour, courageous action or self-sacrifice while not engaged in direct action with the enemy. It may be awarded to civilians as well as military personnel, sometimes posthumously. It is third in order of precedence of peacetime gallantry awards and comes after the Ashoka Chakra and the Kirti Chakra. It precedes the Yudh Seva Medal.[total recipients 2094]. [total awarded posthumously is 677].

History
Established as the "Ashoka Chakra, Class III" by the President of India, 4 January 1952 (with effect from 15 August 1947). The statutes were revised and the decoration renamed on 27 January 1967. Before 1967, the award was known as the Ashoka Chakra, Class III. Subsequent awards of the Shaurya Chakra are recognized by a bar to the medal ribbon (to date five have been awarded). It is possible for a recipient to be awarded the Ashoka Chakra or Kirti Chakra in addition for separate acts of gallantry.

Since July 1999, it also being given to Civilians of either gender in all walks of life, other than members of Police Forces and of recognized Fire Services. From 1 February 1999, the central government set a monthly stipend of Rs. 750 for recipients of the award. Jammu and Kashmir awards a cash award of Rs. 700 (ca. 1960) for recipients of the Shaurya Chakra.

Design
Medal: Circular bronze, 1-3/8 inches in diameter. In the centre, the Ashoka Chakra, surrounded by a lotus wreath and with an ornate edge. Suspended by a straight bar suspender. The medal is named on the edge.

Reverse: For pre-1967 awards, the medal is blank in the centre, with "Ashoka Chakra" in Hindi along the upper edge on the medal and the same name in English along the lower rim, "ASHOKA CHAKRA". On either side is a lotus design. The centre is blank, perhaps with the intent that details of the award be engraved there. There is no indication of the class on the pre-1967 awards. For the post-1967 awards, the, names are changed to "Shauryua Chakra" in Hindi above and "SHAURYA CHAKRA" below.

Ribbon: Green colour ribbon divided into four equal parts by three orange vertical lines.

Bar: If a recipient of the Chakra shall again perform such an act of gallantry as would have made him or her eligible to receive the Chakra, such further act of gallantry shall be recognised by a Bar to be attached to the riband by which the Chakra is suspended and, for every subsequent act of gallantry, an additional Bar shall be added and such Bar or Bars may also be awarded posthumously. For every such Bar, a replica of the Chakra in miniature shall be added to the riband when worn alone.

Eligibility
It is the peacetime equivalent of the Vir Chakra. It is generally awarded for Counter-Insurgency operations and actions against the enemy during peace-time.

Following categories of persons are eligible for the Shaurya Chakra:
 Officers and men and women of all ranks of the Army, the Navy and the Air Force, of any of the Reserve Forces, of the Territorial Army, Militia and of any other lawfully constituted forces.
 Nursing officers of military nursing service .
 Civilian citizens of either sex in all walks of life and members of Police Forces including Central Para-Military Forces and Railway Protection Force.

Recipients

References

External links
 Shaurya Chakra at Indian Army website
 List of Shaurya Chakra Awardees
 Shaurya Chakra Recipients
 Gallantry Awards | Ministry of Defence, Government of India

Military awards and decorations of India
Awards established in 1952
1952 establishments in India
Courage awards